The Mostaq Ahmad cabinet was the Government of Bangladesh from 15 August 1975 to 6 November 1975.

President−Khondaker Mostaq Ahmad
Vice President– Mohammad Mohammadullah

List of Cabinet Ministers

State Ministers

References

Cabinets of Bangladesh
Cabinets established in 1975